Zaca Creek was an American country music group formed in 1989. The band consisted of brothers Gates, Scot, Jeff and James Foss. Their debut single, "Sometimes Love's Not a Pretty Thing," was their only song to reach the Top 40 of the Billboard Hot Country Singles chart, peaking at No. 38. It was included on their eponymous debut album, issued in 1989 on Columbia Records. The group was signed by Giant Records in 1992, who released their second album, Broken Heartland. The band broke up in 1994.

Discography

Albums

Singles

Music videos

References

External links
[ allmusic ((( Zaca Creek > Overview )))]

Country music groups from California
Columbia Records artists
Giant Records (Warner) artists